Tetracha lacordairei, known commonly as "Lacordaire's Metallic Tiger Beetle", is a species of tiger beetle that was described by the French entomologist Hippolyte Louis Gory in 1833 and named after Belgian entomologist Jean Théodore Lacordaire; it is found in Colombia, French Guiana, Suriname, and Venezuela.

References

Beetles described in 1833
Beetles of South America
Cicindelidae